Kim Min-woo (February 5, 1986 in Seoul, South Korea – October 4, 2007) was a South Korean ice dancer. He competed with sister Kim Hye-Min. Together they were the 2003-2005 South Korean national champions. They twice placed 15th at the Four Continents Championships. Kim & Kim were coached by Igor Yaroshenko and Irina Romanova. They retired from competitive skating in 2006.

He died of a car accident in Seoul on October 4, 2007.

Competitive highlights
(with Kim)

References

External links
 

1986 births
2007 deaths
South Korean male ice dancers
Figure skaters at the 2003 Asian Winter Games
Figure skaters from Seoul
Road incident deaths in South Korea
Competitors at the 2005 Winter Universiade